The Nissan Armada is a full-size SUV manufactured by Nissan for the North American market. From 2003 to 2015, the first-generation Armada was assembled in Canton, Mississippi based on the Nissan Titan. From mid-2016 onwards, the second-generation Armada has been built in Yukuhashi, Kyushu, Japan and shares the same platform as the Nissan Patrol, with American-specific modifications, and went on sale in late mid-2016 as a 2017 model. A luxury version of the Armada has been sold as the Infiniti QX80 (originally QX56). 


First generation (TA60; 2004)

The 2004 model Pathfinder Armada was unveiled on April 17, 2003, at the New York International Auto Show. Developed under Carlos Ghosn's NRP (Nissan Revival Plan), development was done in September 1999 to 2003 under lead designers Shiro Nakamura and Diane Allen and chief engineers Yuzo Sakita and Larry Dominique. In January 2001, a final exterior design by Giovanny Arroba had been approved by Sakita, Allen, Nakamura, and Nissan executive management, with the final design freeze being completed in July 2001. It is assigned the platform code TA60.

Prototypes based on the Y61 Patrol were hand-assembled as mules from 2001, with the first TA60-specific prototypes being completed and sent to testing in early 2002. Design patents were filed in 2003, with production starting on August 14, 2003, and going on sale on October 1, 2003.

This was mated to a 5-speed automatic transmission, and the Armada had a choice of either rear-wheel drive or four-wheel drive. There are some Armadas that are capable of using E85.

The rear door handles are installed on the "C" pillar as part of a Nissan design tradition that started with the 1986 Nissan Pathfinder. When the four-door Pathfinder was introduced, Nissan chose to conceal the door handles as a part of the "C" pillar trim to visually make it appear like a two-door truck with a camper shell, with conventional door handles on the front doors.

The switch to the Armada name occurred in September 2004, where it received new badges without "Pathfinder."

2008 refresh 
A facelift was designed through 2005, being introduced in early 2007 for the 2008 model year.

Standard features now include an 8.0 inch infotainment screen, a new front fascia and rear fascia, new headlamp and fog lamp designs, and a new one-piece roof rack design.

The latest Nissan Armada Platinum edition features a 9.3 GB hard drive for storing music, and a CF (Compact Flash) memory card reader. The Platinum edition also features a power liftgate and third-row seats that fold electronically.

The 2011 model year Armada removed the SE and Off-Road trim levels and moved to a tiered system: SV (base trim), SL (middle trim), and Platinum (top trim). Nissan discontinued the use of the Armada platform for the Infiniti QX56 produced in Japan.

The 2013 model year added Bluetooth and satellite radio as standard on all models and a Platinum Reserve trim package. Navigation added NavWeather capability, Zagat Survey, Bluetooth audio streaming, one USB port, and a 40 GB disk drive. The Nissan DVD Entertainment System mounted screens in the back of the front head restraints.

The 2014 model year updated the steering wheel.

The 2015 model year updated interior door panels.

The Nissan Armada (TA60) was sold in the United States (including all US territories), Canada, Mexico, and the Middle East in left-hand-drive only.

Second generation (Y62; 2017) 

Nissan unveiled the second-generation Armada at the 2016 Chicago Auto Show, and it went on sale in August 2016 as a 2017 model. This version is based on the Nissan Patrol, the platform also used for the Infiniti QX80, as moving the Armada and Patrol to the same global platform instead of the Armada sharing the platform of the American-built Titan saves considerable development cost. Apart from the Endurance V8 engine, which is assembled in Decherd, Tennessee, the vehicle is built in Japan. The Armada grew in length and width, but the wheelbase and height were moderately reduced.

The exterior moderately differs from the updated Patrol, which was introduced in early 2014. As with the previous generation, the Armada continued to offer 2WD and 4WD and available in SV, SL, and Platinum trims. It has been described as a large-sized, low-volume, but high-profit model for Nissan.

2021 refresh
An updated version of the Nissan Armada was revealed in December 2020. The front end was redesigned, with a larger grille and "C"-shaped LED headlights along with two new exterior colors. The taillights were redesigned as well, and are also LED. Inside, the center console was redesigned, with a wider infotainment screen with wireless Apple CarPlay and wired Android Auto along with a wireless smartphone charger standard. Nissan's "Safety Shield 360" became standard. A Midnight Edition, which treats the exterior to an under-the-radar, blacked-out color scheme, was also added. The updated Armada went on sale in North America in late January 2021.

For the 2022 model year, one-touch power-folding third row seats were added as standard equipment for the Armada Platinum.

Sales

References

External links

Official Nissan Armada website

Armada
Full-size sport utility vehicles
All-wheel-drive vehicles
Rear-wheel-drive vehicles
Cars introduced in 2003
Motor vehicles manufactured in the United States
2010s cars
2020s cars